Gergana Kirilova (born 18 June 1972) is a Bulgarian weightlifter, competing in the 63 kg category and representing Bulgaria at international competitions. She competed at world championships, most recently at the 2006 World Weightlifting Championships.

Kirilova tested positive for a steroid in 2008 during an out-of-competition test, along with ten other weightlifters, and therefore Bulgaria's weightlifting federation withdrew its team from the 2008 Summer Olympics in Beijing, China. Apart from Cholakov the athletes who tested positive were Ivailo Filev, Alan Tsagaev, Velichko Cholakov, Ivan Stoitsov, Ivan Markov, Georgi Markov, Demir Demirev, Milka Maneva, Donka Mincheva and Mehmed Fikretov.

Major results

See also
 Georgi Markov (weightlifter)
 Bulgarian records in Olympic weightlifting

References

Further reading
 Weightlifting - Gergana KIRILOVA
 Bulgarian Weightlifters Victorious in Kiev
 Bulgaria pulls Olympic weightlifters for doping

1972 births
Living people
Bulgarian female weightlifters
Place of birth missing (living people)
World Weightlifting Championships medalists
Doping cases in weightlifting
20th-century Bulgarian women
21st-century Bulgarian women